A ranch is a place where ranching, a process of raising livestock, especially cattle, is performed.

Ranch may also refer to:
 Dude ranch, a type of ranch oriented towards visitors or tourism
 Ranch-style houses, a style of single-story house
 Ranch (brothel), a common term for a legal brothel
 Ranch dressing, a flavor of salad dressing

Film and television
 The Ranch (film), a 2004 TV film starring Carly Pope
 The Ranch, a Netflix television sitcom
 "Ranch", an episode from season 3 of Man Seeking Woman
 "The Ranch", an episode from season 5 of Paranormal Witness

Other uses
 The Ranch (band), a former three-member country band headed by Keith Urban
 The Ranch (album), this band's only album
 The Ranch, Minnesota, in La Garde Township, Mahnomen County, Minnesota
 The Ranch, a 1997 novel by Danielle Steel
 "The Ranch", an early nickname for Area 51

See also

  or 
  or 
 Rancher (disambiguation)
 Rancheria (disambiguation)
 Rancho (disambiguation)